Deep Blue Something is an American rock band who are known for their 1995 hit single "Breakfast at Tiffany's" from their second album Home. Home achieved gold-record status; however, the band parted ways with Interscope Records and went on creative hiatus for several years, only releasing the follow-up Byzantium in Japan and some European countries. They eventually signed with the Aezra label and released Deep Blue Something in mid-2001, breaking up shortly after. The band regrouped with all members at the end of 2014 and signed to John Kirtland's independent label, Kirtland Records.

History
The group was founded in 1991 in Denton, Texas, by brothers Todd and Toby Pipes, students at the University of North Texas at the time. The brothers enlisted drummer John Kirtland and guitarist Clay Bergus. Deep Blue Something originally performed as Leper Messiah, after the line from David Bowie's "Ziggy Stardust".

Bergus left the band before the band started recording their first album, 11th Song. The band independently released the album in 1993. Kirk Tatom joined the band after the album's release. In 1994, the band released their second album, Home, via an independent label named Brando Records. Home was re-released a year later by major label Interscope Records. The accompanying single "Breakfast at Tiffany's" peaked at number five on the Billboard Hot 100 and topped the charts in the United Kingdom. According to Todd Pipes, the lyrics of the song were inspired by Audrey Hepburn's performance in the feature film Roman Holiday, but he thought that the Hepburn film Breakfast at Tiffany's would make a better song title.

The huge success of the single and lack of follow-up activity led to their classification as a one-hit-wonder band within music circles. 
In late 1995, Tatom left the band and Bergus returned to his role as guitarist. The band worked on their third album, titled Byzantium, with a planned release in 1996. However, Deep Blue Something came into legal troubles over the copyright of 11th Song and "Breakfast at Tiffany's". Although the lawsuits were finally settled, Interscope put the album on hold, focusing on other label artists such as Limp Bizkit. Interscope eventually released the album in 1998, but only in Japan.

The band then sued Interscope and won a release from their contract. They later signed with Aezra Records, an independent label based in Phoenix, Arizona. Their self-titled album, which contains five tracks from Byzantium, was released by Aezra in 2001. Shortly after the album's release, the band "drifted apart," and its members worked on separate projects for over a decade.

In 2014, Todd Pipes posted an Instagram photo teasing that the band was back together and working on a new project, eventually revealed to be an EP titled Locust House. The EP was released as a digital download on June 29, 2015.

Other activities of band members
Todd and Toby Pipes have become producers for Flickerstick, Demp, Calhoun, the Greater Good, Coma Rally, Moonshot Radio, Porter Block, and The Nadas. They have earned Best Producer honors from the Fort Worth Weekly three years in a row and have been highlighted in Mix Magazine. The Pipes brothers work primarily out of Bass Propulsion Laboratories in Dallas, a three-studio facility which they also own.

Todd Pipes (born November 9, 1967), has released a solo album, Taurus Petals, on Authentic Records. It was released on November 25, 2008. Later on he released an EP, Polar Patterns, on Idol Records. It was released on September 25, 2012. He released an EP "Mainsail To Skyking" on Idol Records. It was released on August 3, 2018.

Toby Pipes (born June 28, 1971), formed the band The Hundred Inevitables, with Jeff Whittington and released an album, Studder, in early 2000.  In 2005, he formed a new band Little Black Dress with Nolan Thies. In 2009 they were the first band signed onto Exploding Plastic Records, a new Idol Records sub-label. Their debut album Snow in June was released June 2009.

John Kirtland runs an independent record label, Kirtland Records. Based in Dallas, Texas, and Los Angeles, California, Kirtland's business dealings led to his ownership of the back-catalog of the band Bush and royalty rights on the sales of certain albums by the band No Doubt. Kirtland quickly sold off his rights to the No Doubt material, but retained the rights to the Bush back catalog until 2014, when they were sold to a consortium that included Bush frontman Gavin Rossdale. However, Kirtland Records continues to feature Texas-based indie bands such the Burden Brothers, The Polyphonic Spree and Toadies, and was the issuing label for Deep Blue Something's 2015 EP, Locust House.

Clay Bergus has been a manager at Eddie V's Prime Seafood in Fort Worth since its opening in spring 2009.

Kirk Tatom formed an acoustic duo with fellow Texas musician Greg Beutel, performing under the name Whiskey Pants.

Personnel
 Clay Bergus – acoustic & electric guitars, backing vocals (1991–1992, 1995–2001, 2014–present)
 John Kirtland – drums, percussion (1991–2001, 2014–present)
 Toby Pipes – acoustic & electric guitars, lead & backing vocals (1991–2001, 2014–present)
 Todd Pipes – bass guitar, lead & backing vocals (1991–2001, 2014–present)
 Kirk Tatom – acoustic & electric guitars, backing vocals (1993–1995, 2014–present)

Discography

Studio albums

Extended plays

Singles

Notes

+ "Halo" peaked outside of the US Billboard Hot 100 chart, therefore they are listed on the Bubbling Under Hot 100 chart.

References

External links
 Deep Blue Something on Myspace
 

Alternative rock groups from Texas
Interscope Records artists
Kirtland Records artists
Musical groups established in 1991
Musical groups disestablished in 2001
Musical groups reestablished in 2014
Musical groups from Denton, Texas